William John Griffiths (5 April 1879 – 16 October 1928) was an Australian rules footballer who played with Fitzroy and South Melbourne in the Victorian Football League (VFL).

Griffiths played his early football at Essendon Town, in the Victorian Football Association.

He appeared eight times for Fitzroy in the 1903 VFL season but was not selected in the finals. The following year he took the field with South Melbourne and played eight games in his first season and one more in 1905.

Griffiths was a field umpire for one league game in 1911 and a boundary umpire in 19 games between 1911 and 1913.

After retiring from football, Griffiths kept active as a district cricketer and spent some time with the St Kilda Cricket Club. He was a member of the Elsternwick second eleven when he was killed in 1928, while practicing. A ball had struck him on the head as he was attempting to take a catch and he suffered a skull fracture. He was taken to The Alfred Hospital but died soon after.

References

External links 

1879 births
1928 deaths
Australian rules footballers from Melbourne
Fitzroy Football Club players
Sydney Swans players
Essendon Association Football Club players
Australian Football League umpires
Sport deaths in Australia
Accidental deaths in Victoria (Australia)
Cricket deaths
People from Flemington, Victoria